Monica Hanna is an Egyptologist. She is Dean at the Arab Academy for Science, Technology & Maritime Transport. In 2014, she was awarded the SAFE Beacon Award.

Life 
She graduated from American University in Cairo, and from University of Pisa.

She organized the Egyptian Heritage Task Force. She opposed the movement of sphinxes to Tahrir Square.

Works 

 Hanna, Monica, 2015. "Documenting Looting Activities in Post-2011 Egypt." Countering Illicit Traffic in Cultural Goods: The Global Challenge of Protecting the World’s Heritage. Paris: ICOM, pp. 47–63.
Monica Hanna, “What Has Happened to Egyptian Heritage after the 2011 Unfinished Revolution?,” Journal of Eastern Mediterranean Archaeology and Heritage Studies 1, no. 4 (2013): 371–75
Katherine Blouin, Monica Hanna and Sarah E. Bond, How Academics, Egyptologists, and Even Melania Trump Benefit From Colonialist Cosplay, Hyperallergic, October 22, 2020

References

External links 

 4 Leading Egyptologists Share the Secrets of Their Field — Google Arts & Culture
BBC World Service - Outlook, Saving Egypt's Treasures, 7 May 2014

Living people
Egyptologists
Year of birth missing (living people)
The American University in Cairo alumni
University of Pisa alumni
Academic staff of the Arab Academy for Science, Technology & Maritime Transport